Poyraz is a Turkish name, meaning north or northeasterly wind, from the Greek , boreas (meaning "north" or "north wind"),  and may refer to:

 Akçakoca Poyraz G.S.K., Turkish basketball club based in Düzce
 Ergün Poyraz, Turkish non-fiction writer
 Ihsan Poyraz, Austrian footballer
 Poyraz, Elâzığ

Turkish-language surnames